Michael James Carey is an American computer scientist. He currently serves as Bren Professor of Information and Computer Science in the Donald Bren School at the University of California, Irvine.

Education 

Carey earned his Ph.D. in computer science from the University of California at Berkeley in 1983. He also holds a M.S. in Electrical Engineering (Computer Engineering) from Carnegie-Mellon University (earned 1981) and a B.S. (University Honors) in Electrical Engineering and Mathematics from Carnegie-Mellon University (earned 1979).

Life and career 

From 1983 to 1995, Carey taught in the Computer Sciences Department at the University of Wisconsin-Madison. After which, he worked as Research Staff Member/Manager at IBM Almaden Research Center in San Jose, California.

Carey was elected a member of the National Academy of Engineering in 2002 for contributions to the design, implementation, and evaluation of database systems.

He has been a Donald Bren Professor of Computer and Information Sciences in the Department of Computer Science at the University of California, Irvine since 2008.
Since 2015 Carey has served as a Consulting Chief Architect at Couchbase, Inc.
Carey has published over 200 research papers, journal articles, book chapters and other publications that primarily focus on Big Data management, database management systems, information integration, middleware, parallel and distributed systems, and computer system performance evaluation.

Awards and honors 

 Fellow, Institute for Electrical and Electronic Engineers (IEEE), 2017.
 IEEE TCDE Computer Science, Engineering, and Education (CSEE) Impact Award, 2016.
 Chancellor's Award for Excellence in Fostering Undergraduate Research, UC Irvine, 2010.
 ACM SIGMOD Edgar F. Codd Innovations Award, 2005.
 Test of Time Paper Award, ACM SIGMOD Conference, 2004.
 Member, National Academy of Engineering, 2002.
 Distinguished Alumnus Award, EECS Department, UC Berkeley, 2002.
 Fellow, Association for Computing Machinery (ACM), 2000.

Patents 
Carey holds 11 patents in the United States.

References 

Year of birth missing (living people)
Living people
University of California, Irvine faculty
American computer scientists
UC Berkeley College of Engineering alumni
Carnegie Mellon University alumni
University of Wisconsin–Madison faculty
Members of the United States National Academy of Engineering
Fellow Members of the IEEE
Fellows of the Association for Computing Machinery
American inventors